A fire department (North American English) or fire brigade (Commonwealth English), also known as a fire authority, fire district, fire and rescue, or fire service in some areas, is an organization that provides fire prevention and fire suppression services.

Fire departments are most commonly a public sector organization that operate within a municipality, county, state, nation, or special district. Private and specialist firefighting organizations also exist, such as those for aircraft rescue and firefighting.

A fire department contains one or more fire stations within its boundaries, and may be staffed by firefighters, who may be professional, volunteers, conscripts, or on-call. Combination fire departments employ a mix of professional and volunteer firefighters.

Organization

Fire departments are organized in a system of administration, services, training, and operations; for example:

 Administration is responsible for supervision, budgets, policy, and human resources.
 Service offers protection, safety, and education to the public.
 Training prepares people with the knowledge and skills to perform their duties.
 Operations performs tasks to mitigate harm to persons, property, and the environment. 
A fire service is normally set up where it can have fire stations, fire engines and other relevant equipment strategically deployed throughout the area it serves, so that dispatchers can send fire engines, fire trucks, or ambulances from the fire stations closest to the incident. Larger departments have branches within themselves to increase efficiency, composed of volunteers, support, and research.

 Volunteers give additional support to the department in a state of emergency.
 Support organizing the resources within and outside of the department.
 Research is to give advantages in new technologies for the department.

Jurisdiction

Most places are covered by a public sector fire department, which is established by a local or national government and funded by taxation. Even volunteer fire departments may still receive some government funding.

The typical size of a fire department varies greatly by country. In the United States, firefighting is usually organized on a municipal level. Some municipalities belong to "fire protection districts" that are served by the same fire department, such as the San Ramon Valley Fire Protection District. Austria, Germany and Canada also organize fire services at a municipal level. In France, fire services mostly cover one department. In the United Kingdom, most fire services cover one or more counties, while Scotland and Northern Ireland each have a single fire service. In Australia, state governments run the fire services, although three states have separate agencies for metropolitan and rural areas. Poland, the Czech Republic, Israel, Italy, and New Zealand have national fire and rescue services.

Responsibilities

Fire departments may also provide other emergency services, such as aircraft rescue and firefighting, hazardous materials mitigation, technical rescue, and wildland firefighting.

In some countries or regions (e.g., the United States, Germany, Japan, Hong Kong, Macau), fire departments can be responsible for providing emergency medical services. The EMS personnel may either be cross-trained as firefighters or a separate division of emergency medical technicians and paramedics. While some services act only as "first responders" to medical emergencies, stabilizing victims until an ambulance can arrive, other fire services also operate ambulance services.

History

Ancient Rome
The earliest known firefighting service was formed in Ancient Rome by Marcus Egnatius Rufus who used his slaves to provide a free fire service. These men fought fires using bucket chains and also patrolled the streets with the authority to impose corporal punishment upon those who violated fire-prevention codes. The Emperor Augustus established a public fire department in 24 BCE, composed of 600 slaves distributed amongst seven fire stations in Rome.

1600s and 1700s
Fire departments were again formed by property insurance companies beginning in the 17th century after the Great Fire of London in 1666. The first insurance brigades were established the following year. Others began to realize that a lot of money could be made from this practice, and ten more insurance companies set up in London before 1832: The Alliance, Atlas, Globe, Imperial, London, Protector, Royal Exchange, Sun Union and Westminster. Each company had its own fire mark, a durable plaque that would be affixed to the building exterior. Although a popular legend says a company's fire brigade would not extinguish a burning building if it did not have the correct fire mark, there is little evidence to support this; evidence shows insurance companies required their firefighters to fight every fire they encountered.

Amsterdam also had a sophisticated firefighting system in the late 17th century, under the direction of artist Jan van der Heyden, who had improved the designs of both fire hoses and fire pumps.

The city of Boston, Massachusetts established America's first publicly funded, paid fire department in 1679. Fire insurance made its debut in the American colonies in South Carolina in 1736, but it was Benjamin Franklin who imported the London model of insurance. He established the colonies' first fire insurance company in Philadelphia named the Philadelphia Contributionship, as well as its associated Union Volunteer Fire Company, which was an unpaid (volunteer) company.

A document dated in 1686 informs about the payment system of four so called "fire servants" (German: Feuerknecht) in Vienna, which is the official founding year of the Vienna Fire Departement.

In 1754, Halifax, Nova Scotia established the Halifax Regional Fire and Emergency, which is today Canada's oldest fire department.

In 1764, Haddonfield, New Jersey established the second oldest fire company in the United States.

In 1773, the city of Petersburg, Virginia established one of the first fire departments in the United States and it was also made up of unpaid volunteers

1800s
In the 19th century, the practice of fire brigades refusing to put out fires in buildings that were uninsured led to the demand of central command for fire companies. Cities began to form their own fire departments as a civil service to the public, obliging private fire companies to shut down, many merging their fire stations into the city's fire department. In 1833, London's ten independent brigades all merged to form the London Fire Engine Establishment (LFEE), with James Braidwood as the Chief Officer. Braidwood had previously been the fire chief in Edinburgh, where the world's first municipal fire service was founded in 1824, and he is now regarded, along with Van der Heyden, as one of founders of modern firefighting. The LFEE then was incorporated into the city's Metropolitan Fire Brigade in 1865 under Eyre Massey Shaw.

Established in 1853, the Cincinnati Fire Department is the oldest paid fully professional municipal fire department in the United States.

In 1879, the University of Notre Dame established the first University-based fire department in the United States

1900s
In 1906, the first motorized fire department was organized in Springfield, Massachusetts, after Knox Automobile of Springfield produced the first modern fire engine one year earlier.

See also
 Compulsory fire service
 Emergency service
 Fire engine
 List of fire departments
 Volunteer fire department
Fire department ranks by country

Notes

References

Firefighting